Mauro Frizzoni (17 December 1926 – 24 December 2004) was an Italian sprinter.

Biography
He won two medals at the International athletics competitions, he has 1 cap in national team in 1951.

Achievements

See also
 Italy national relay team
 Italy at the 1951 Mediterranean Games

References

1926 births
2004 deaths
Italian male sprinters
Mediterranean Games gold medalists for Italy
Mediterranean Games silver medalists for Italy
Athletes (track and field) at the 1951 Mediterranean Games
Mediterranean Games medalists in athletics